Ian McDonald (born 5 February 1951) is a Scottish former footballer who made 25 appearances in the Football League playing as a midfielder for Darlington in the 1970s. He was on the books of Wolverhampton Wanderers, without representing them in the League, and went on to play non-league football for Whitley Bay.

References

1951 births
Living people
Footballers from Inverness
Scottish footballers
Association football midfielders
Wolverhampton Wanderers F.C. players
Darlington F.C. players
Whitley Bay F.C. players
English Football League players